The 2002–03 Copa Federación de España was the tenth staging of the Copa Federación de España, a knockout competition for Spanish football clubs in Segunda División B and Tercera División.

The Regional stages began in 2002, while the national tournament took place from 14 November 2002 to 17 April 2003.

Regional tournaments

Asturias tournament

Preliminary round

Group A

Group B

Group C

Group D

Final bracket

Castile and León tournament

National tournament

Preliminary round

|}

Round of 32

|}

Round of 16

|}

Quarter-finals

|}

Semifinals

|}

Final

|}

References
2000–2009 Copa Federación results
Asturias tournament results

Copa Federación de España seasons